Kwun Eun-jeong (born 18 August 1974) is a South Korean basketball player. She competed in the women's tournament at the 1996 Summer Olympics.

References

External links
 

1974 births
Living people
South Korean women's basketball players
Olympic basketball players of South Korea
Basketball players at the 1996 Summer Olympics
People from Suwon
Sportspeople from Gyeonggi Province